The European Atlas of the Seas is an easy-to-use and interactive web-based atlas on the coasts and seas within and around Europe and provides information on Europe's marine environment. It is freely accessible on the internet.  The latest version of the Atlas was released on the 16 September 2020 in the 24 official languages of the European Union.   

The Atlas is provided by the European Commission, Directorate-General for Maritime Affairs and Fisheries, in the context of the implementation of the integrated maritime policy  (Communication 'An Integrated Maritime Policy for the European Union', COM(2007) 575 final, 10/10/2007).

Other names: European atlas of the oceans, European coastal atlas, European maritime atlas, European marine atlas

Purpose 
The European Atlas of the Seas brings statistical data in a comprehensive way to professionals, students and anyone interested in learning more about Europe's seas and coasts, their environment, related human activities and European policies.

Content 
The European Atlas of the Seas offers a diverse range of information on topics.  
Users can view predefined and ready to use maps, covering topics such as environment, tourism, security, energy, transport, litter, sea bottom, fishing activity, aquaculture, and much more.
Users can also benefit from an enriched catalogue with more than 250 map layers, covering a wide range of topics, to explore, collate and create their own maps. These maps can be printed, shared and embedded in articles or presentations. The Atlas is the ideal tool for schools, researchers and professionals, or anyone wishing to know more about the European seas and its coastal areas.

The Atlas is an Open Data platform and benefits from the important contributions of many data providers. These are primarily the European Commission and its agencies (European Environment Agency, Eurostat,…), 
as well as the European Marine Observation and Data Network ([EMODnet]), which is a network of organisations supported by the EU's integrated maritime policy.  The information source and date appears in each map's description.

Geographical coverage 
The European Atlas of the Seas covers the seas and oceans within and around Europe: 
 Arctic Ocean
 Atlantic Ocean, including the Celtic Sea, the Bay of Biscay, and the North Sea
 Baltic Sea
 Black Sea
 Mediterranean Sea
 Outermost regions of the European Union
 White Sea

History

See also 

 European Maritime Day

References

External links 
 Atlas of the Seas, European Commission

Atlases
Oceans
Geography of Europe